Callytron alleni is a species of tiger beetles in the genus Callytron.

References

Cicindelidae